The Balochistan Awami Party is a political party based in the Balochistan province of Pakistan founded in 2018 by political dissidents of the Pakistan Muslim League (N) and the Pakistan Muslim League (Q) in Balochistan.

The party emerged as the largest party in Balochistan as a result of the 2018 Pakistani general election. It leads a coalition government in the province and is also a part of the ruling coalition in the National Assembly. It also has 4 elected members in the KP Assembly.

Origins
On 24 December 2015, Sanaullah Zehri of the Pakistan Muslim League (N) was sworn in as the Chief Minister of Balochistan. His tenure lasted for two years, until on 2 January 2018, dissident MPAs of his own party rebelled against him and decided to support the opposition in a motion of no confidence against him. Fearing defeat, Zehri resigned as Chief Minister on 9 January 2018, and was replaced 4 days later by Abdul Quddus Bizenjo on 13 January. This was largely seen as a setback for the PML-N in the province.

Two months later in the Senate elections, the PML-N failed to secure a single seat in the province. Instead, independents supported by the new provincial government won 6 out of the 11 seats that were up for election. This was seen as another setback for the PML-N.

Furthermore, this group of senators, with the support of the provincial government, decided to launch their own candidate for the Election of Chairman in the senate. This group secured the backing of Pakistan Tehreek-e-Insaf, the Pakistan Peoples Party and many other parties which allowed them to elect their candidate Sadiq Sanjrani as Senate Chairman, securing 57 out of 103 votes.

Foundation
Following these events, rumours emerged of a new political party being formed. On 29 March 2018, Saeed Hashmi and Anwaar-ul-Haq Kakar announced the creation of the BAP and declared that it had the support of 32 out of 65 lawmakers in the Balochistan Assembly.

On 16 May 2018, the party elected Jam Kamal Khan, former Federal Minister of State for Petroleum, as their leader.

Elections

2018 election
The party has only fielded candidates in one election since its founding: the 2018 Pakistani general election. In the election it fielded 67 candidates on all of the general seats in Balochistan, of which 19 were elected (15 PA, 4 NA).

This result allowed the party to form the provincial government in the province. As well as this, they also aided the Pakistan Tehreek-e-Insaf in forming the federal government by supporting them with their 5 MNAs.

On 28 March 2022, the party announced that they will support opposition parties in the no-confidence motion against PM Imran Khan.

Electoral performance

Senate of Pakistan

National Assembly

Balochistan Assembly

References

2018 establishments in Pakistan
Federalism in Pakistan
Federalist parties
Muslim League breakaway groups
Political parties established in 2018
Political parties in Pakistan